Psammophis is a genus of snakes in the family Psammophiidae. The genus comprises 33 species, which are found in Africa and Asia. Psammophis are diurnal and prey on lizards and rodents which they actively hunt. All species in the genus are venomous, and the venom is considered mild and not dangerous to humans.

Etymology
The generic name Psammophis was coined by the Austrian herpetologist Leopold Fitzinger in 1826, a compound of the Hellenistic Greek ψαμμο, "sand" + Classical Greek ὄϕις, "snake", thus sand-snake.

Description
In the genus Psammophis the maxillary teeth are 10 to 13 in number, with one or two in the middle much enlarged and fang-like, preceded and followed by an interspace; the two posterior teeth are grooved. The anterior mandibular teeth are long, and the posterior teeth are small. The head is elongated and distinct from the neck, with an angular canthus rostralis. The eye is rather large, with a round pupil. The body is elongated and cylindrical with smooth dorsal scales in 15 or 17 rows at midbody, with apical pits. The ventral scales are rounded or obtusely angulate laterally, and the tail is long with the subcaudals in two rows.

Geographic range
Thirty-three species of Psammophis are known, from Africa and southern Asia. One fossil species, Psammophis odysseus, is known to have inhabited the Iberian Peninsula during the Miocene, indicating that the genus managed to successfully colonize mainland Europe in the wake of the Messinian salinity crisis, only to be extirpated from there shortly afterwards.

Behavior
Psammophis species are chiefly sand-snakes, but they are also found on low bushes.

Diet
Species in the genus Psammophis feed principally on lizards.

Reproduction
All species in the genus Psammophis are oviparous.

Species
The following 35 extant species are recognized as being valid:

Psammophis aegyptius 
Psammophis afroccidentalis 
Psammophis angolensis 
Psammophis ansorgii 
Psammophis biseriatus 
Psammophis brevirostris 
Psammophis condanarus 
Psammophis crucifer 
Psammophis elegans 
Psammophis indochinensis 
Psammophis jallae 
Psammophis leightoni 
Psammophis leithii 
Psammophis leopardinus 
Psammophis lineatus 
Psammophis lineolatus 
Psammophis longifrons 
Psammophis mossambicus 
Psammophis notostictus 
Psammophis orientalis 
Psammophis phillipsii 
Psammophis praeornatus 
Psammophis pulcher 
Psammophis punctulatus 
Psammophis rukwae 
Psammophis schokari 
Psammophis sibilans 
Psammophis subtaeniatus 
Psammophis sudanensis 
Psammophis tanganicus 
Psammophis trigrammus 
Psammophis turpanensis 
Psammophis zambiensis

Fossil species
†Psammophis odysseus 

Nota bene: A binomial authority in parentheses indicates that the species was originally described in a genus other than Psammophis.

References

Further reading
Fitzinger LI (1826). Neue Classification der Reptilien nach ihre natürlichen Verwandtschaften. Nebst einer Verwandtshafts-tafel und einem Verzeichnisse der Reptilien-Sammlung des K.K. zoologischen Museum's zu Wien. Vienna: J.G. Heubner. five unnumbered + 67 pp. + one plate. (Psammophis, new genus, p. 29). (in German and Latin).

Psammophis
Taxa named by Leopold Fitzinger
Snake genera